Sarah Wells (born November 10, 1989) is a Canadian hurdler who specializes in the 400 metres hurdles. She competed in the 2012 Olympic Games and finished 22nd over all. Wells won the silver medal in the 400 metres hurdles at the 2015 Pan American Games in Toronto, Ontario, Canada.

Life 
Wells was born on November 10, 1989 in Markham, Ontario and she attended University of Toronto.

 Finished 24th, 400 meter hurdles at the 2012 London Olympic Games
1st 2007, 2010, 2012 and 2015 National Championships 
2nd 400 m hurdles 2015 Pan American Games 
3rd 400 m hurdles 2013 FISU Summer Universiade Kazan, Russia 
6th 400 m hurdles, 2008 IAAF World Junior Championships
 Personal best: 55.65, Lucerne 17 July 2013 
 Owned the Canadian Youth under-17 record of 59.48 seconds in the 400m hurdles in 2006.

Filmography

Television

References

External links

Sarah Wells personal site

1989 births
Living people
Canadian female hurdlers
Olympic track and field athletes of Canada
Athletes (track and field) at the 2012 Summer Olympics
Sportspeople from Markham, Ontario
Track and field athletes from Ontario
Pan American Games bronze medalists for Canada
Pan American Games silver medalists for Canada
Athletes (track and field) at the 2015 Pan American Games
Pan American Games medalists in athletics (track and field)
Universiade medalists in athletics (track and field)
Universiade silver medalists for Canada
The Amazing Race Canada contestants
Medalists at the 2013 Summer Universiade
Medalists at the 2015 Pan American Games